Valeggio is the name of two Italian villages:

 Valeggio, Lombardy in the province of Pavia
 Valeggio sul Mincio in the province of Verona

it:Valeggio